Carrie Howe (born May 13, 1981) is an American sailor. She competed in the Yngling event at the 2008 Summer Olympics.

References

External links
 

1981 births
Living people
American female sailors (sport)
Olympic sailors of the United States
Sailors at the 2008 Summer Olympics – Yngling
People from Grosse Pointe, Michigan
Sportspeople from Michigan
21st-century American women